Hampton Court astronomical clock is a sixteenth-century astronomical clock in Hampton Court Palace.

History and description

The clock was installed in 1540 on the gatehouse to the inner court at Hampton Court Palace. It was designed by Nicholas Crazter and made by Nicholas Oursian. This pre-Copernican and pre-Galilean astronomical clock is still functioning.

 Hour
 Month
 Day of month
 Twelve signs of the zodiac
 Position of the Sun in the ecliptic relative to the background stars (zodiac)
 Number of days since the beginning of the year
 Phases of the moon
 Days since last new moon ( "age of the moon")
 Hour when it passes meridian/anti-meridian and thus high water at London Bridge.

The latter information was of great importance to those visiting this Thames-side palace from London, as the preferred method of transport at the time was by barge. Two consequences flowed: journey time, which departing around high water would speed instead of hinder; and all but the most skilled or reckless watermen above the bridge would avoid nearing London Bridge at times of great surface-water ebb under the (then famously built-up, barrage-like) bridge to avoid being swept into the starlings (cutwaters) or arches above.

The clock was restored in 1711 by William Herbert, with a simplified 18th century face, while retaining the 24-hour dial, and a single clock hand. The astrological dials were removed, and subsequently mislaid.  In 1831 the mechanism was replaced with that of a 1799 clock from St James's Palace. In 1879 the astronomical dials were rediscovered and replaced, and Gillett & Bland manufactured a new clock movement.

The clock was fully restored in 2007 and 2008 by the Cumbria Clock Company in Dacre, Cumbria in time for the 500th anniversary of the accession of King Henry VIII.

The clock features both on the cover and in the plot of Robert Galbraith’s Troubled Blood.

See also
 List of public art in Richmond upon Thames

References

External links
 

Astronomical clocks in the United Kingdom
Hampton Court Palace
Individual clocks in England
1540 establishments in England
Material culture of royal courts